Sport Clube Os Dragões Sandinenses is a Portuguese sports club from Sandim, Vila Nova de Gaia.

The men's football team plays in the Honra Série A of the Porto Football Association. The team played in the third tier of Portuguese football until being relegated from the 2006–07 Segunda Divisão, and then experiencing a crushing relegation from the 2007–08 Terceira Divisão, losing every single game.

Former players

  Wesley John - Saint Vincent and the Grenadines international who played in Portugal for 23 years, including for clubs Ribeira Brava and Porto da Cruz, both below the Portuguese fourth tier)

References

Football clubs in Portugal
Association football clubs established in 1927
1927 establishments in Portugal